Anders Bruun (born 15 May 1979) is a Swedish bandy player who currently plays for Västerås SK as a defender.

Career
Bruun is a youth product of IFK Motala and has represented their senior team, Västerås, and Volga.

References

External links

1979 births
Living people
Swedish bandy players
IFK Motala players
Västerås SK Bandy players
Volga Ulyanovsk players
Expatriate bandy players in Russia